Håkøya is an island in Tromsø Municipality in Troms og Finnmark county, Norway.  The  island is located in the Sandnessundet strait between the islands Kvaløya and Tromsøya. It is southeast of the village of Eidkjosen on Kvaløya and west of the city of Tromsø on Tromsøya.

The higher elevations on the island are wooded, while residential houses, cabins, and farms are mostly located on the coastal areas. The original bridge was wooden, but the upper part was replaced with steel and concrete in 2004.

History
The German battleship Tirpitz was located at Håkøya starting on 15 October 1944 until 12 November 1944, when it was sunk by British bombers during Operation Catechism. A memorial to the roughly 1200 people who died on the Tirpitz now stands on Håkøya.

Media gallery

See also
List of islands of Norway

References

Tromsø
Islands of Troms og Finnmark